Marko Nunić (born 16 March 1993) is a Slovenian professional footballer who plays as a striker for Primorje.

Career
In 2018, Nunić joined Greek side AEL. On 14 May 2021, there was an official announcement that his contract was terminated by mutual agreement.

In October 2021, he signed a contract with Romanian club Dinamo București. He was released from Dinamo on 31 January 2022, after five games played in Liga I, without scoring a goal. The next day, he signed a contract with Cypriot First Division club PAEEK.

References

External links
sport24.gr
larissanet.gr
footballdatabase.eu
gazzetta.gr (video highlights)
superleaguegreece.net

1993 births
Living people
Footballers from Ljubljana
Slovenian footballers
Association football forwards
Slovenian PrvaLiga players
Slovenian Second League players
Super League Greece players
Liga I players
Cypriot First Division players
NK Olimpija Ljubljana (2005) players
NK Radomlje players
NK Aluminij players
NK Zavrč players
ND Gorica players
Athlitiki Enosi Larissa F.C. players
FC Dinamo București players
PAEEK players
Slovenian expatriate footballers
Expatriate footballers in Greece
Slovenian expatriate sportspeople in Greece
Expatriate footballers in Romania
Slovenian expatriate sportspeople in Romania
Expatriate footballers in Cyprus
Slovenian expatriate sportspeople in Cyprus